Whelpdale v Cookson (1747) 27 ER 856 is an English trusts law case, also relevant for UK company law, on the duty of loyalty owed by a trustee to beneficiaries of the trust.

Facts
A trustee purchased land that was owned by the trust.

Judgment
Lord Hardwicke gave the judgment of the court. The text in the English Report reads as follows.

See also

Keech v Sandford

Notes

English trusts case law
United Kingdom company case law
1747 in British law
Court of Chancery cases